St Mary's Church is a Church of England church in Burnham on Crouch, Essex. It is Grade II* listed

References

Burnham on Crouch, St Mary's church
Grade II* listed churches in Essex
Burnham-on-Crouch